Perry is a town in Aiken County, South Carolina, United States. The population was 233 at the 2010 census. It is part of the Augusta, Georgia metropolitan area.

Geography
Perry is located at  (33.627689, -81.311114) in eastern Aiken County. A place called the Indian Head (springs) located just east of Pry on the Old Indian Trail. Site of an ancient Native American and colonial activity. It was on the Richard Davis tract of 1767.

Demographics

As of the census of 2000, there were 237 people, 94 households, and 62 families residing in the town. The racial makeup of the town was 55.27% White, 44.30% African American and 0.42% Native American.

There were 94 households, out of which 34.0% had children under the age of 18 living with them, 38.3% were married couples living together, 23.4% had a female householder with no husband present, and 33.0% were non-families. 29.8% of all households were made up of individuals, and 7.4% had someone living alone who was 65 years of age or older. The average household size was 2.52 and the average family size was 3.16.

In the town, the population was spread out, with 31.2% under the age of 18, 7.6% from 18 to 24, 27.4% from 25 to 44, 24.5% from 45 to 64, and 9.3% who were 65 years of age or older. The median age was 33 years. For every 100 females, there were 80.9 males. For every 100 females age 18 and over, there were 79.1 males.

The median income for a household in the town was $23,750, and the median income for a family was $31,250. Males had a median income of $30,625 versus $23,000 for females. The per capita income for the town was $13,171. About 27.1% of families and 30.4% of the population were below the poverty line, including 51.3% of those under the age of eighteen and none of those 65 or over.

References

Towns in Aiken County, South Carolina
Towns in South Carolina
Augusta metropolitan area